The Linguistic Society of Hong Kong (LSHK) is a non-profit academic association, which was formally registered as a charitable organization in Hong Kong on 8 March 1986.

They are the creators of "The Linguistic Society of Hong Kong Cantonese Romanization Scheme" known as Jyutping.

See also 

 Hong Kong Cantonese

References

External links
 

Languages of Hong Kong
Linguistic societies